Guillermo Cornejo (25 June 1919 – 25 November 1990) was a Peruvian sports shooter. He competed at the 1956, 1960 and 1964 Summer Olympics.

References

1919 births
1990 deaths
Peruvian male sport shooters
Olympic shooters of Peru
Shooters at the 1956 Summer Olympics
Shooters at the 1960 Summer Olympics
Shooters at the 1964 Summer Olympics
People from Arequipa
Pan American Games medalists in shooting
Pan American Games bronze medalists for Peru
Shooters at the 1959 Pan American Games
20th-century Peruvian people